The Sheldon Concert Hall in St. Louis, Missouri was designed by noted 1904 World's Fair architect Louis C. Spiering and built in 1912 as the home of the Ethical Society of St. Louis. Musicians and public speakers throughout the years have enjoyed the perfect acoustics of the Sheldon Concert Hall, earning The Sheldon its reputation as "The Carnegie Hall of St. Louis." Well-known singers and ensembles have performed at The Sheldon, and speakers such as Albert Einstein, Dwight Eisenhower and Ernest Hemingway have spoken from its stage. The St. Louis Chapter of the League of Women Voters was founded in The Sheldon's Green Room.

When the Ethical Society relocated to St. Louis County in 1964, The Sheldon became primarily a music venue. Then, in 1974, a former singer with the Duke Ellington Orchestra purchased the facility, transforming The Sheldon into a church and the site for many jazz and gospel concerts. A California attorney with a love for chamber music purchased the building in 1984 at the urging of the Paganini String Quartet. He engaged Walter F. Gunn to restore the building and upon completion Gunn began operating The Sheldon in 1986 as a venue for concerts and community events.

Determined to preserve and establish The Sheldon as one of St. Louis’ greatest cultural resources, Gunn founded the non-profit Sheldon Arts Foundation in 1988. Under Gunn's leadership the Sheldon was named one of the Best Loved Halls in America by touring musicians in Inside Performance Magazine hosting over 400 events per year. Gunn was awarded the prestigious Dawson Achievement Award for arts management from the Association of Performing Arts Professionals. Gunn wrote a song called “Sweet Sheldon” to save the Sheldon when it went up for sale. The song raised enough for the Foundation to purchase the building in 1991, and today the Sheldon Arts Foundation is governed by a 45-member Board of Directors. The Sheldon Concert Hall is the site of over 300 events each year, including jazz, folk and classical music concerts, featuring artists such as Dave Brubeck, Wynton Marsalis, José Carreras, Herbie Hancock, Doc Watson, Joan Baez, Willie Nelson, Julian Bream, Itzhak Perlman, B.B. King, and Jessye Norman.

The Sheldon's renovations continued in 2001 with the installation of five new stained-glass windows designed by Rodney Winfield. His designs, called "Theme and Variation", are designed to be seen both during the day and at night.

The Sheldon is located in the Grand Center arts district of St. Louis.

Sheldon Art Galleries
The Sheldon Art Galleries encompass  and feature exhibits on photography, architecture, St. Louis artists and collection, jazz history, emerging artists and children's art.  Over 20 changing exhibitions are held each year.

References

External links
 The Sheldon Concert Hall & Art Galleries
 3D Virtual Tour of The Sheldon Concert Hall

Art museums and galleries in Missouri
Concert halls in Missouri
Landmarks of St. Louis
Museums in St. Louis
Music venues in St. Louis
Tourist attractions in St. Louis
Midtown St. Louis
1912 establishments in Missouri